The 1995 San Diego tank rampage was the theft of an M60A3 tank by a local man—Shawn Timothy Nelson—and his destruction of cars and utilities therewith in suburban San Diego.

Nelson was a native Californian and United States Army veteran with unusual habits that drew the attention of his neighbors.  In late spring 1995, the 35-year-old had recently suffered financial, professional, and interpersonal setbacks, some of which stemmed from long-term substance abuse.

After the tank crashed and was partially disabled, San Diego police forced it open before shooting and killing Nelson.

Nelson's motives are unknown, though speculated-upon.  The incident raised questions about military security at the Guard armory, and spurred changes in California's tank storage.

Background

Shawn Nelson

Born on August 21, 1959 in California, Shawn Timothy Nelson was the second of Betty and Fred Nelson's three sons.  He attended James Madison High School—where he was a sophomore during the 1975–1976 academic year, grew up in Clairemont, San Diego, and later married Suzy Hellman in 1984.

In 1978, Nelson enlisted in the United States Army.  He was stationed in Germany with the Armor Branch as a tank commander.  Private Nelson separated in 1980 due to multifaceted' disciplinary problems" with an honorable discharge.  Afterwards, he began a successful career in plumbing, eventually starting his own San Diego business in 1991.

A patient at Sharp Memorial Hospital in 1990, Nelson later sued the hospital over a fight involving an emergency room security guard.  Nelson sued them again in 1992 for malpractice, the same year his mother died there.  The lawsuits were consolidated and dismissed in 1993.  Nelson's brother would later say that Shawn Nelson "thought he got a raw deal there".

In Clairemont, Nelson was a minor celebrity for his unusual behavior.  He spent nighttime hours mowing his lawn and digging for gold in a  backyard pit, his property was covered in machine detritus and garbage, and police had visited nine times in 1994–95 "on calls ranging from reports of domestic violence to a complaint that Nelson's van had been stolen."  He was renowned, but not well-known by his neighbors.

Nelson long struggled with alcohol abuse and methamphetamines, a factor in his wife leaving in 1991.  Nelson's van and plumbing tools were stolen in June 1994, and his contracting business declined.  By May 1995, Nelson had "a history of medical problems", including a spinal fracture caused by a motorcycle crash.  Unemployed, his house on Willamette Avenue was being foreclosed upon, his utilities had been shut off, an eviction notice had been served, and he had recently broken up with a girlfriend.  Nelson made "statements alluding to suicide".

Armory
Armory personnel usually left by 6p.m.

It has a  M73 machine gun,  M2 Browning heavy machine gun, and  M68 tank gun; these weapons systems at the San Diego armory were all unloaded.

Theft and destruction
On the evening of May 17, the armory's gates were unsecured because personnel were working late.  Nelson was uncontested at 6:30p.m. when he drove his Chevrolet van onto the property.  The shirtless and disheveled man then broke the padlocks on three different tanks before starting an M60A3.  Nelson crashed through the armory's gate at approximately 6:45 in the evening.

Nelson drove the tank through residential San Diego neighborhoods, where residents described the destruction as intentional: "He didn't go down the center of the street, [...] It seems he just wanted to get the utilities and cause as much as damage without hurting people." Nelson inflicted no injuries during his 25-minute rampage.

The San Diego Police Department (SDPD) learned of the incident at 6:46p.m. when a detective reported that he was following Nelson.  SDPD units headed to intercept the tank, and California State Route 163 (SR 163) was closed.  An SDPD captain said of Nelson's tank skills: "He obviously knew what he was doing. He was working that tank pretty good."

Death
The impact dislodged one of the tank's treads. Four SDPD officers boarded the tank and opened the hatch (which was in "combat lockdown") with bolt cutters. Nelson refused to surrender and attempted to dislodge the police by spinning the tank.

Having no armament capable of penetrating the armor, and unsure whether Nelson was armed, police shot him.  Two days after the incident, the Los Angeles Times reported that Nelson was shot in the right shoulder, and The New York Times said he was alive when pulled from the tank; 18 days after the event, People published that Nelson had been shot in the left shoulder, killing him immediately.  Sharp Memorial later reported that Nelson died of "gunshot wounds", and the San Diego coroner's office said that Nelson "smelled of alcohol."

Aftermath
Nelson's friends criticized the shooting, saying police should have used tear gas or crisis negotiation; SDPD captain Tom Hall defended the decision, saying "[t]he bottom line was, we had to stop this guy."

For legal culpability, the California Guard was found to be negligent and therefore responsible.  The state paid out a total of :  to Pacific Bell,  to the city of San Diego,  to San Diego Gas & Electric, and the rest to individual citizens (mostly for damage to vehicles).

In the following years, the uncertainty of Nelson's motives led to commentators projecting their theories onto his actions: "a saga about the middle class under siege; a fable about the emasculation of American men; a warning about what happens when ex-servicemen, lacking foreign enemies and domestic opportunities, bring the war home."

National Guard
Immediately afterwards, the National Guard planned to send two additional tanks to SR 163 to help maneuver the disabled tank onto a flatbed truck.

The Guard confirmed that vehicles entering the armory grounds were not checked (despite heightened security after the recent Oklahoma City bombing).  Major Ed Gale told the media that Nelson apparently broke an exterior lock on the tank to gain access, and that it was the first tank theft at the armory.  By the next day, the batteries had been removed from 28 more National Guard tanks in Southern California, and San Diego Mayor Susan Golding had written to California Governor Pete Wilson, demanding an investigation into the armory's security.

By November 1996, the Guard had improved security and awareness at its armories, and moved all its tanks to either Fort Irwin or Camp Roberts.

See also

References

Further reading

 
 
 

deaths by firearm in California
events in San Diego
individual thefts
military history of California
motor vehicle theft
power outages in the United States
vehicular rampage in the United States